"When I Fall In Love" is the twelfth single by Ant & Dec, formerly known as PJ & Duncan and the second to be taken from their final album The Cult of Ant & Dec.

Track listing
 When I Fall in Love - Radio Edit with Rap
 When I Fall in Love - Radio Edit without Rap
 When I Fall in Love - Unboza Remix
 Gonna B Alright

Chart performance

References

Ant & Dec songs
1996 singles
1996 songs
Songs written by Matt Rowe (songwriter)
Songs written by Richard Stannard (songwriter)
Telstar Records singles
Songs written by Declan Donnelly
Songs written by Anthony McPartlin